Switzerland competed at the 1968 Summer Paralympics in Tel Aviv, Israel from November 4 to 13, 1968. The team finished twenty-second in the medal table and won a total of eight medals; two silver and six bronze. Thirty-four Swiss athletes took part; thirty-two men and two women.

See also 
 Switzerland at the 1968 Summer Olympics

References

Nations at the 1968 Summer Paralympics
1968
Paralympics